Since 1976, when the Supreme Court of the United States lifted the moratorium on capital punishment in Gregg v. Georgia, 18 women have been executed in the United States. Women represent less than 1.15 percent of the 1,561 executions performed in the United States since 1976.

See also
 List of juveniles executed in the United States since 1976
 List of United States Supreme Court decisions on capital punishment
 List of women on death row in the United States

Notes

References

American female murderers
American female criminals
American people convicted of murder
Executed in the United States since 1976
Women in the United States since 1976
People executed for murder